Juliani is a surname. Notable people with the surname include:

Alessandro Juliani (born 1975), Canadian actor and singer
John Juliani (1940-2003), Canadian actor, writer, producer, director, and educator
Peter Juliani, Pope John XXI, Bishop of Rome, and head of the Catholic Church.

See also
Juliano (surname)